Notpron (originally stylized as Not Pr0n) is an online puzzle game and internet riddle created in 2004 by German game developer David Münnich. It has been hailed by fans, journalists, and Münnich himself as "the hardest riddle available on the internet".

Regarded as one of the first of the online puzzle game genre, Notpron follows a standard puzzle game layout, where the player is presented with a webpage containing a riddle and must find the answer to the riddle in order to proceed to the next webpage. The game has a total of 138 "levels", ranging from 82 "positive" levels, 44 "negative" levels, and 12 "Greek" levels (Ranging from "Alpha" to "Lambda"). These three level groups do not differ from each other, apart from having different names, though each consecutive level increases in difficulty. Levels consist of finding either a password (known as a "UN/PW" by the game's community) or finding a URL to use in order to proceed to the next level. Passwords do not require a player to create an account but instead are given to a player once they have found the answer to a level's riddle. Each level answer or solution is unique, often requiring specific skills such as decoding ciphers, image editing, musical knowledge, and formerly remote viewing.

History

Inspired by a game he played online entitled "This is not Porn", Münnich created the first five levels in 2004, put them in a folder temporarily called "notpron", and posted it on his website. Soon thousands of people showed up to play the game and, by then, it was too late to change the name. 
As of October 2020, only 100 people have completed the game, out of 20 million visitors since August 2004.
The official list of the solvers can be found here.

Reception

Kashann Kilson of Inverse called the game "the perfect combination of a logic puzzle and an online scavenger hunt."

Spin-offs

Several Notpron-inspired websites have been created which achieved significant popularity, the most prominent being Truly Kryptic, Amnesya, OddPawn and E.B.O.N.Y.

References

External links
 Official website

Browser games
Internet properties established in 2004
2004 video games
Puzzle video games
Video games developed in Germany